Grant County may refer to:

Places 
Australia
 County of Grant, Victoria

United States
Grant County, Arkansas 
Grant County, Indiana 
Grant County, Kansas 
Grant County, Kentucky 
Grant County, Minnesota 
Grant County, Nebraska 
Grant County, New Mexico 
Grant County, North Dakota 
Grant County, Oklahoma 
Grant County, Oregon 
Grant County, South Dakota 
Grant County, Washington
Grant County, West Virginia 
Grant County, Wisconsin

Other uses 
 Grant County, Georgia, a fictional place in the works of Karin Slaughter

See also
 Grant Parish, Louisiana

United States county name disambiguation pages